Boar Tush is an unincorporated community in Winston County, Alabama, United States. It was also called Boartusk.

A post office was established as Boartush in 1885, and it closed one year later, in 1886.

References

Unincorporated communities in Winston County, Alabama
Unincorporated communities in Alabama